Irsen Latifović (born 28 December 1969) is a German former professional footballer who played as a forward.

Career
Born in Freiburg im Breisgau in West Germany, Latifović started playing in the youth and reserves teams of VfB Stuttgart. He then played with SV Böblingen before joining FC Hansa Rostock and playing with them in the 1993–94 2. Bundesliga. Next he moved to Holstein Kiel where he spend the next season, before spending two seasons abroad, in Serbia, first playing with FK Novi Pazar in the 1995–96 Second League of FR Yugoslavia, and then, with FK Napredak Kruševac in the 1996–97 Second League of FR Yugoslavia. In 1999, he was back in Germany playing with TSF Ditzingen, followed by two seasons, 2000–01 and 2002–03, spent with his former club, SV Böblingen.

References

1969 births
Living people
Sportspeople from Freiburg im Breisgau
German footballers
Serbian footballers
Footballers from Baden-Württemberg
Association football forwards
2. Bundesliga players
VfB Stuttgart players
VfB Stuttgart II players
SV Böblingen players
FC Hansa Rostock players
Holstein Kiel players
TSF Ditzingen players
FK Novi Pazar players
FK Napredak Kruševac players
German expatriate footballers
Expatriate footballers in Serbia and Montenegro